was a Japanese actor who appeared in almost 200 feature films. Dropping out of Waseda University, he worked as a model before entering the film industry in 1956. After years of work, Sugawara finally established himself as a famous actor at the age of 39, with the lead role of Shozo Hirono in the Battles Without Honor and Humanity series (1973–1976) of yakuza films. He quickly found additional success starring as the truck driver Momojiro Hoshi in the comedic Torakku Yarō series (1975–1979). In 1980, Sugawara won the Japan Academy Prize for Best Supporting Actor for his role as a detective in the satirical Taiyō o Nusunda Otoko (1979).

Life and career
Sugawara was born in Sendai, Miyagi Prefecture. His father was a newspaper reporter. His parents divorced when he was four, and he moved to Tokyo to live with his father and stepmother. As part of a wartime policy to evacuate children from major cities, he was moved back to Sendai during fourth grade. As an adult he entered Waseda University's law program, but was dropped in his second year for failing to pay and began work as a model. He had minor roles in the Shiki Theatre Company.

His first film role was in the 1956 Toho film Aishu no Machi ni Kiri ga Furu. Sugawara appeared in Teruo Ishii's 1958 White Line after being scouted by the Shintoho studio.  At Shintoho he gained starring roles despite being a newcomer. However, when Shintoho filed for bankruptcy in 1961, Sugawara moved to the Shochiku studio where he was cast in Masahiro Shinoda's Shamisen and Motorcycle, but was fired from the role for coming to set late after a night drinking. He gave a notable performance in Keisuke Kinoshita's Legend of a Duel to the Death (1963), but it did not fare well at the box office. Disenchanted with the low pay, and what he felt were unsuitable roles, he left and went to Toei in 1967 after being recommended by Noboru Ando.

He had a part in Ishii's 1967 Abashiri Bangaichi: Fubuki no Toso, one of many films in the director's Abashiri Prison series. Sugawara's first starring role at Toei was in Gendai Yakuza: Yotamono no Okite in 1969. It launched a series, with the last installment, 1972's Street Mobster by Kinji Fukasaku, being the most successful. He achieved major success in 1973 at the age of 40, when he starred in Fukasaku's five-part yakuza epic Battles Without Honor and Humanity. Based on a real-life yakuza conflict in Hiroshima, the series was very successful, and popularized a new type of yakuza film called the Jitsuroku eiga, and the role of Shozo Hirono still remains his most well known. Sugawara also starred in Fukasaku's Cops vs. Thugs in 1975. Also in 1975, he starred in the comedy Torakku Yarō: Go-Iken Muyō as love-seeking truck driver Momojiro Hoshi, which launched a successful ten-installment series. Sugawara won the 1980 Japan Academy Prize for Best Supporting Actor for his role as a detective in Kazuhiko Hasegawa's 1979 satirical film Taiyō o Nusunda Otoko.

His son Kaoru died in a railroad crossing accident in October 2001 at the age of 31. In 2007, Sugawara was diagnosed and treated with radiation for bladder cancer.

On February 23, 2012, Sugawara announced his retirement from acting. He came to the decision after the Great East Japan earthquake and being hospitalized in the winter of 2011, although he said he might consider future roles. Late in life, he took up farming in Yamanashi Prefecture.

On November 13, 2014, Sugawara was checked into a Tokyo hospital after having a routine checkup. He died in the hospital from liver failure caused by liver cancer on November 28 at 3:00am, aged 81. A funeral for family was held on November 30 at Dazaifu Tenmangū, and his death was publicly announced by Toei on December 1.

Filmography

Films

Aishu no machi ni kiri ga furu (1956)
Shirosen himitsu chitai (1958) - Goto , Sudo's Henchman
Joôbachi no ikari (1958) - Jôji
Mofubuki no shito (1959) - Kinya
Ama no bakemono yashiki (1959) - Detective Nonomiya
Kurutta yokubô (1959)
Kyûjûkyû-honme no kimusume (1959) - Abe Masayuki
Onna dorei-sen (1960) - Sugawa
Bakudan wo Daku Onna Kaitô (1960) - Asakura - Railroad Security Officer
Taiheiyô Sensô: Nazo no senkan Mutsu (1960) - Naval officer
Kuroi chibusa (1960) - Hiroshi Taniguchi
Mejû (1960) - Sugiyama
Otoko no sekai da (1960)
Bôryoku Gonin Musume (1960) - Kazuhiko Nanjô
Fûryû kokkei-tan: Sennin buraku (1961)
Shamisen to ootobai (1961)
Shitô no densetsu (1963) - Gôichi Takamori
Miagete goran yoru no hoshi o (1963) - Miwa
Iroboke yokuboke monogatari (1963)
Kô ni kieta aitsu (1963)
Kawachi no kaze yôri-abare daikô (1963)
 The Scent of Incense (1964) - Sugiura
Kodoku (1964)
Nippon paradaisu (1964)
Yoru no henrin (1964) - Tamura
Kuchikukan yukikaze (1964)
Chi to okite (1965)
Blood and Rules (1965)
Highway no Ohsama (1965)
Zokû seiun yakuza - ikarî no otoko (1965)
Seiun yakuza (1965)
Kao o kase (1966)
Honoo to okite (1966) - Ôtsu
Otokonokao wa rirekisho (1966)
Sora ippai no namida (1966) - Sakaki
Kinokawa (1966) - School principal
Ahendaichi jigokubutai totsugekseyo (1966)
Shinka 101: Koroshi no Yojinbo (1966)
Otoko no kon (1966)
Dôsu-dokyô no hanamichi (1966)
Abashiri Bangaichi: Fubuki no Toso (1967) - Mamushi
Utage (1967) - Lieutenant Kuruihara
Zenka mono (1968)
Gorotsuki (1968)
Hibotan bakuto: Isshuku ippan (1968) - Shiraishi
Bakuto retsuden (1968) - Masakichi
Kyôdai jingi gyakuen no sakazuki (1968)
Kaibyô nori no numa (1968) - Ukon Shibayama
Heitai gokudo (1968)
Gokudo (1968) - Sasaki Toshiya
Gokuaku bôzu (1968) - Ryotatsu
Furyô banchô: Inoshika Ochô (1969)
Tabi ni deta gokudo (1969)
Gendai Yakuza: Yotamono Jingi (1969) - Goro
Yakuza Law (1969)
Nihon boryoku-dan: Kumicho (a.k.a. Japan Organized Crime Boss) (1969)
Kantô Tekiya ikka (1969)
Soshiki Bōryoku Kyodaisakazuki (1969)
Nihon boryoku-dan: Kumicho (1969) - Kazama
Gorotsuki butai (1969)
Gokuaku bôzu: nenbutsu hitokiri tabi (1969)
Gendai yakuza: Yotamono no okite (1969)
Furyo bancho okuri ookami (1969)
Chôeki san kyôdai (1969)
Chi-zome no daimon (a.k.a. Bloodstained Clan Honor) (1970)
Kantô Tekiya ikka: Goromen jingi (1970)
Hibotan bakuto: Oryû sanjô (1970) - Tsunejioro
Furyô banchô: Ikkaku senkin (1970)
Kantô Tekiya ikka: Tennôji no kettô (1970)
Nippon dabi katsukyu (1970)
Saigo no tokkôtai (1970)
Gokuaku bozu hitokiri kazoe uta (1970) - Ryutatsu
Hitokiri kannon-uta (1970) - Blind Priest Ryotatsu
Gendai yakuza: Shinjuku no yotamono (1970) - Big Brother Katsumata
Shin kyôdai jingi (1970)
Sengo hiwa, hoseki ryakudatsu (1970)
Nihon jokyo-den: tekka geisha (1970) - Yukichi
Gokudo kyojo tabi (1970) - Izumi Tatsuya
Gokuaku bozu nenbutsu sandangiri (1970)
Gendai ninkyô kyôdai-bun (1970)
Furyo bancho kuchi kara demakase (1970)
Bâkuto jingi: sâkazukî (1970)
Kantô Tekiya ikka: Goromen himatsuri (1971)
Gokuaku bozu - Nomu utsu kau (1971)
Kigeki toruko-buro osho-sen (1971)
Kantô kyôdai jingi ninkyô (1971) - Takazaki Taichiro
Nippon jokyô-den: Gekitô Himeyuri-misaki (1971)
Gendai yakuza: Chizakura san kyodai (1971)
Onna toseinin: ota no mushimasu (1971)
Mamushi no kyôdai: Orei mairi (1971)
Gendai yakuza: Sakazuki kaeshimasu (1971)
Furyo bancho yarazu buttakuri (1971)
Chōeki Tarō: Mamushi no Kyōdai (1971)
Akû oyabûn tai daigashî (1971)
Hibotan bakuto: Jingi tooshimasu (1972)
Mamushi no kyôdai: Chôeki jûsankai (1972)
Junko intai kinen eiga: Kantô hizakura ikka (1972) - Yuijiro
Gendai Yakuza: Hitokiri Yota (a.k.a. Street Mobster) (1972) - Isamu Okita
Gokudo makari touru (1972) - Ishido Tsuneo
Mamushi no kyôdai: Shôgai kyôkatsu jûhappan (1972)
Kogarashi Monjirô: Kakawari gozansen (1972) - Monjirô Kogarashi
Outlaw Killers: Three Mad Dog Brothers (1972)
Hijirimen bakuto (1972)
Yakuza to kôsô: Jitsuroku Andô-gumi (1972)
Kogarashi Monjirô (1972) - Monjirô
Furyo gai (1972)
Bakuchi-uchi Gaiden (1972)
Battles Without Honor and Humanity (1973) - Shozo Hirono
Mamushi no kyôdai: Musho gurashi yonen-han (1973)
Battles Without Honor and Humanity: Deadly Fight in Hiroshima (1973) - Shozo Hirono
Yakuza tai G-men (1973) - Lee Chung Shun, Narcotics Group Boss
Mamushi no kyôdai: Kyôkatsu san-oku-en (1973)
Tokyo-Seoul-Bangkok (1973)
Battles Without Honor and Humanity: Proxy War (1973) - Shozo Hirono
Yokosuka Navy Prison (1973)
Yamaguchi-gumi San-daime (1973) - Big Boss Hachiro
Kâigun o shu ga kêimushyô (1973)
Battles Without Honor and Humanity: Police Tactics (1974) - Shozo Hirono
Gakusei yakuza (1974)
Bôryoku gai (1974) - Gizagoro's dragon
Lubang tô no kiseki: Rikugun Nakano gakkô (1974)
Battles Without Honor and Humanity: Final Episode (1974) - Shozo Hirono
Gokudo VS Mamushi (1974)
Andô-gumi gaiden: Hitokiri shatei (1974)
New Battles Without Honor and Humanity (1974) - Miyoshi Makio
Mamushi no kyôdai: Futari awasete sanjuppan (1974) - Masataro of Mamushi's
Jitsuroku hishyakaku ôkami domo no jingi (1974) - Ishikuro Hikoichi
Â kessen kôkûtai (1974)
Mamushi to aodaishô (1975) - Goromasa
Dai dâtsu gokû (1975)
Daidatsugoku (1975) - Kunizo Kuniiwa
Cops vs. Thugs (1975) - Detective Kuno
Torakku yarô: Goiken muyô (1975) - Momojirô Hoshi - Ichibanboshi
Kobe Kokusai Gang (1975) - Kenzo Otaki
New Battles Without Honor and Humanity: The Boss's Head (1975) - Shuji Kuroda
Torakku yarô: Bakusô Ichibanboshi (1975)
New Battles Without Honor and Humanity: Last Days of the Boss (1976) - Shuichi Nozaki
Torakku yarô: Bôkyô Ichibanboshi (1976)
Baka Masa Hora Masa Toppa Masa (1976) - Bakamasa
Torakku yarô: tenka gomen (1976)
Yamaguchi-gumi gaiden: Kyushu shinko-sakusen (1977) - Yozakura
Yakuza senso: Nihon no Don (1977) - Eizo Iwami
Nihon no jingi (1977)
Torakku yarô: Dokyô ichibanboshi (1977)
Bokusâ (1977) - Hayato, ex-boxer
Nippon no Don: Yabohen (1977) - Shinsuke Tembo
Torakku yarô: Otoko ippiki momojirô (1977)
Shinjuku yoidore banchi: Hitokiri tetsu (1977)
Inubue (1978) - Shiro Akitsu
Torakku yarô: Totsugeki ichiban hoshi (1978) - Hoshi Momojiro
Dynamite Dondon (1978) - Kasuke
Nihon no Don: Kanketsuhen (1978) - Akira Kawanishi
Yokohama ankokugai mashingan no ryu (1978) - Ryuta Yabuki
Torakku yarô: Ichiban hoshi kita e kaeru (1978) - Hoshi Momojiro
Sochô no kubi (1979) - Hachiyo Shunji
Ogon no inu (1979) - Lorry driver
Torakku yarô: Neppû 5000 kiro (1979) - Hoshi Momojiro
Taiyō o Nusunda Otoko (1979) - Inspector Yamashita
Dabide no hoshi: Bishôjo-gari (1979) - Momojirô Hoshi
Torakku yarô: Furusato tokkyûbin (1979) - Hoshi Momojiro
Jingi naki tatakai: Sôshûhen (1980) - Shozo Hirono
The Gate of Youth (1981) - Shigezo Ibuki
Honō no Gotoku (1981) - Senkichi Kotetsu
Yûkai hôdô (1982) - Pilot
Seiha (1982) - Koji Kawakami
Shura no mure (1984)
The Burmese Harp (1985) - Platoon Commander
Rokumeikan (1986) - Count Kageyama
Eiga joyû (1987) - Kenji Mizoguchi
Kuroi doresu no onna (1987) - Shoji
Za samurai (1987) - Samurai
Tsuru (1988) - Rich man
Yawara! (1989) - Kojiro Inokuma
My Phoenix (1989)
Rimeinzu: Utsukushiki yuusha-tachi (1990) - Kasuke
Tekken (1990) - Seiji Nakamoto
Distant Justice (1992) - Rio Yuki
The Man Who Shot the Don (1994)
Kizu darake no tenshi (1997) - Joji Kurai
Dora-heita (2000) - Nadanamiya Hachirobe, aka Daikashi no Nadahachi
Watashi no Grandpa (2003) - Godai Kenzo
The Great Yokai War (2005) - Shuntaro Ino
The Battery (2007) - Yozo Ioka
Chikyû de tatta futari (2008)

Anime
Spirited Away (2001) - Kamajî
The Snow Queen (2005–2006)
Tales from Earthsea (2006) - Ged/Sparrowhawk
Wolf Children (2012) - Nirasaki (final film role)

Television
Shishi no Jidai (1980) - Hiranuma Senji
Musashibō Benkei (1986) - Minamoto no Yoritomo
Takeda Shingen (1988) - Itagaki Nobukata
Furuhata Ninzaburō (1994) - Otojiro Kogure
Tokugawa Yoshinobu (1998) - Tokugawa Nariaki
Toshiie and Matsu (2002) - Maeda Toshimasa

Video games
Dissidia: Final Fantasy (2008) - Cid / Narrator
Dissidia 012 Final Fantasy (2011) - Cid / Narrator

Dubbing
Samurai Jack - Aku

See also

References

External links

1933 births
2014 deaths
20th-century Japanese male actors
21st-century Japanese male actors
Deaths from cancer in Japan
Deaths from liver cancer
Japanese male film actors
People from Sendai
Taiga drama lead actors